The 19th Annual GMA Dove Awards were held on 1988 recognizing accomplishments of musicians for the year 1987. The show was held in Nashville, Tennessee.

Award recipients
Song of the Year
"In The Name Of The Lord"; Phil McHugh, Gloria Gaither, Sandi Patti; River Oaks Music, Sandi's Songs (BMI), Gaither Music (ASCAP)
Songwriter of the Year
Larnelle Harris
Male Vocalist of the Year
Larnelle Harris
Female Vocalist of the Year
Sandi Patti
Group of the Year
First Call
Artist of the Year
Sandi Patti
New Artist of the Year
Bebe & Cece Winans
Southern Gospel Album of the Year
Symphony of Praise; The Cathedrals; Lari Goss; RiverSong
Inspirational Album of the Year
The Father Hath Provided; Larnelle Harris; Greg Nelson; Benson Records
Pop/Contemporary Album of the Year
Watercolour Ponies; Wayne Watson; Wayne Watson, Paul Mills; DaySpring
Rock Album of the Year
Crack the Sky; Mylon LeFevre & Broken Heart; Mylon LeFevre, Joe Hardy; Myrrh Records
Contemporary Gospel Album of the Year
Decisions (The Winans album); The Winans; Marvin Winans, Barry Hankerson, Carvin Winans, Michael Winans; Qwest/Warner Bros.
Traditional Gospel Album of the Year
One Lord, One Faith, One Baptism; Aretha Franklin; Aretha Franklin; Arista Records
Instrumental Album of the Year
The Wind & The Wheat; Phil Keaggy; Phil Keaggy, Tom Coomes; Colours
Praise and Worship Album of the Year
The Final Word; Michael Card; Norbert Putnam ; Sparrow
Children's Music Album of the Year
Bullfrogs & Butterflies Part III; The Agapeland Singers & Candle; Tony Salerno; Sparrow
Musical Album of the Year
A Son! A Savior!; Claire Cloninger, Gary Rhodes, Bob Krogstad; Word
Short Form Music Video of the Year
"Stay for Awhile"; Amy Grant; Marc Ball; Jack Cole; Myrrh
Long Form Music Video of the Year
The Big Picture Tour Video; Michael W. Smith; Brian Shipley; Stephen Bowlby; Reunion
Recorded Music Packaging of the Year
John Summers, Erik Neuhaus Peaceful Meditation; Greg Buchanan

References

External links
 https://doveawards.com/awards/past-winners/

GMA
1988 in American music
1988 in Tennessee
1988 music awards
GMA Dove Awards